This Is Love, This Is Murderous is the third studio album by American metalcore band Bleeding Through released in 2003. It is their Trustkill Records debut. It has sold more than 125,000 copies since its release.

Audio clips in the beginnings of "Love Lost in a Hail of Gunfire" and "Revenge I Seek" were taken from the cult movie The Boondock Saints.

Music videos were made for the songs "Love Lost in a Hail of Gun Fire" and "On Wings of Lead". "Love Lost in a Hail of Gun Fire" is also available in a censored form on the MTV2 Headbanger's Ball: Volume 2 collection (this is the same edit as the video version). The song "Shadow Walker" is a re-recorded version of a song from the band's debut album Dust to Ashes.

Track listing

The album was re-released on January 25, 2005, in a limited-edition double-disc format. It includes special O-Card packaging and the following extras on the second disc:

Music videos

Three live tracks

Documentary
10-minute documentary with never-before-seen interviews with the band.

Personnel

Bleeding Through
Brandan Schieppati - vocals, guitar
Scott Danough - guitar
Brian Leppke - guitar
Marta Peterson - keyboards
Ryan Wombacher - bass
Derek Youngsma - drums

Guest musicians
Ryan J. Downey - vocals on "City Of The Condemned" (Burn It Down, ex-Hardball, ex-Time In Malta)
Molly Street - credited keyboards
Case One - vocal group
Mike Milford - vocal group (Scars Of Tomorrow, The Artery Foundation)

Artwork and design
Jeff Gros - photography
Heather Finch - model
Jeff Gros - photography
Don Clark - layout design
Ryan Wilson - model, vocal group
Shalon Wyllie - road crew
Biggie - road crew

Production
Ulrich Wild - Producing, Mixing & Mastering @ Giant Peach Compound
Shawn Sullivan - Recording @ World Class Audio
R Dub - road crew
Shawn Sullivan - engineer

Charts

References

Bleeding Through albums
2003 albums
Trustkill Records albums
Albums produced by Ulrich Wild